Father Damien or Saint Damien of Molokai, SS.CC. or Saint Damien De Veuster ( or ; 3 January 1840 – 15 April 1889), born Jozef De Veuster, was a Roman Catholic priest from Belgium and member of the Congregation of the Sacred Hearts of Jesus and Mary, a missionary religious institute. He was recognized for his ministry, which he led from 1873 until his death in 1889, in the Kingdom of Hawaiʻi to people with leprosy (Hansen's disease), who lived in government-mandated medical quarantine in a settlement on the Kalaupapa Peninsula of Molokai.

During this time, he taught the Catholic faith to the people of Hawaii. Father Damien also cared for the patients and established leaders within the community to build houses, schools, roads, hospitals, and churches. He dressed residents' ulcers, built a reservoir, made coffins, dug graves, shared pipes, and ate poi with them, providing both medical and emotional support.

After eleven years caring for the physical, spiritual, and emotional needs of those in the leper colony, Father Damien contracted leprosy. He continued with his work despite the infection but finally succumbed to the disease on 15 April 1889. Father Damien also had tuberculosis which worsened his condition, but some believe that the reason he volunteered in the first place was due to his illness of tuberculosis.

Father Damien has been described as a "martyr of charity". Damien De Veuster is venerated as a saint in the Catholic Church. In the Anglican Communion and other Christian denominations, Damien is considered the spiritual patron for leprosy and outcasts. Father Damien Day, 15 April, the day of his death, is also a minor statewide holiday in Hawaii. Father Damien is the patron saint of the Diocese of Honolulu and of Hawaii.

Father Damien was canonized by Pope Benedict XVI on 11 October 2009. Libert H. Boeynaems, writing in the Catholic Encyclopedia, calls him "the Apostle of the Lepers." Damien De Veuster's feast day is 10 May.

Early life
Father Damien was born Jozef ("Jef") De Veuster, the youngest of seven children and fourth son of the Flemish corn merchant Joannes Franciscus ("Frans") De Veuster and his wife Anne-Catherine ("Cato") Wouters in the village of Tremelo in Flemish Brabant in rural Belgium on 3 January 1840. His older sisters Eugénie and Pauline became nuns, and his older brother Auguste (Father Pamphile) joined the Congregation of the Sacred Hearts of Jesus and Mary (Picpus Fathers). Jozef was forced to quit school at age 13 to work on the family farm. His father sent him to a college at Braine-le-Comte to prepare for a commercial profession, but as a result of a mission given by the Redemptorists in 1858, Joseph decided to pursue a religious vocation.

Jozef entered the novitiate of the Fathers of the Sacred Heart of Jesus and Mary at Louvain and took in religion the name of Damien, presumably after the first Saint Damian, a fourth-century physician and martyr. He was admitted to the religious profession on 7 Oct. 1860. 

His superiors thought that he was not a good candidate for the priesthood because he lacked education. However, he was not considered unintelligent. Because he learned Latin well from his brother, his superiors decided to allow him to become a priest. During his religious studies, Damien prayed daily before a picture of St. Francis Xavier, patron of missionaries, to be sent on a mission. Three years later when his brother Father Pamphile (Auguste) could not travel to Hawaiʻi as a missionary because of illness, Damien was allowed to take his place.

Mission in Hawaii

On 19 March 1864, Damien arrived at Honolulu Harbor on Oʻahu. He was ordained into the priesthood on 21 May 1864, at what is now the Cathedral of Our Lady of Peace.

In 1865 Damien was assigned to the Catholic Mission in North Kohala on the island of Hawaii. While he was serving in several parishes on Oʻahu, the Kingdom of Hawaiʻi was struggling with a labor shortage and a public health crisis. Many of the Native Hawaiian parishioners had high mortality rates due to infectious diseases such as leprosy (from which he later died), smallpox, cholera, influenza, syphilis, and whooping cough, brought to the Hawaiian Islands by foreign traders, sailors and immigrants. Thousands of Hawaiians died of such diseases, to which they had no acquired immunity.

It is believed that Chinese workers carried leprosy (later known as Hansen's disease) to the islands in the 1830s and 1840s. At that time, leprosy was thought to be highly contagious and was incurable. In 1865, out of fear of this contagious disease, Hawaiian King Kamehameha V and the Hawaiian Legislature passed the "Act to Prevent the Spread of Leprosy." This law quarantined the lepers of Hawaii, requiring the most serious cases to be moved to a settlement colony of Kalawao on the eastern end of the Kalaupapa peninsula on the island of Molokai. Later the settlement of Kalaupapa was developed. Kalawao County, where the two villages are located, is separated from the rest of Molokai by a steep mountain ridge. From 1866 through 1969, about 8,000 Hawaiians were sent to the Kalaupapa peninsula for medical quarantine.

The Royal Board of Health initially provided the quarantined people with food and other supplies, but it did not have the workforce and resources to offer proper health care. According to documents of that time, the Kingdom of Hawaiʻi did not intend for the settlements to be penal colonies. Still, the Kingdom did not provide enough resources to support them. The Kingdom of Hawaii had planned for the lepers to be able to care for themselves and grow their crops. Still, due to the effects of leprosy and the peninsula's local environmental conditions, this was impractical.

By 1868, according to the Catholic Encyclopedia (1911), "Drunken and lewd conduct prevailed. The easy-going, good-natured people seemed wholly changed."

Mission on Molokai 

While Bishop Louis Désiré Maigret, the vicar apostolic of the Honolulu diocese, believed that the lepers needed a Catholic priest to assist them, he realized that this assignment had high risk. He did not want to send any one person "in the name of obedience." After much prayer, four priests volunteered to go, among them Father Damien. The bishop planned for the volunteers to take turns in rotation assisting the inhabitants.

On 10 May 1873, the first volunteer, Father Damien, arrived at the isolated settlement at Kalaupapa, where there were then 600 lepers, and was presented by Bishop Louis Maigret. At his arrival, he spoke to the assembled lepers as "one who will be a father to you, and who loves you so much that he does not hesitate to become one of you; to live and die with you." 

Damien worked with them to build a church and establish the Parish of Saint Philomena. In addition to serving as a priest, he dressed residents' ulcers, built a reservoir, built homes and furniture, made coffins, and dug graves. Six months after his arrival at Kalawao, he wrote to his brother, Pamphile, in Europe: "...I make myself a leper with the lepers to gain all to Jesus Christ."

During this time, Father Damien cared for the lepers and established leaders within the community to improve the state of living. Father Damien aided the colony by teaching, painting houses, organizing farms, and organizing the construction of chapels, roads, hospitals, and churches. He also dressed residents, dug graves, built coffins, ate food by hand with lepers, shared pipes with them, and lived with the lepers as equals. Father Damien also served as a priest during this time and spread the Catholic faith to the lepers; it is said that Father Damien told the lepers that despite what the outside world thought of them, they were always precious in the eyes of God.

Some historians believed that Father Damien was a catalyst for a turning point for the community. Under his leadership, basic laws were enforced, shacks were upgraded and improved as painted houses, working farms were organized, and schools were established. At his request and of the lepers, Father Damien remained on Molokai. Many such accounts, however, overlook the roles of superintendents who were Hawaiian or part-Hawaiian. Pennie Moblo states that until the late 20th century, most historical reports of Damien's ministry revealed biases of Europeans and Americans, and nearly completely discounted the roles of the native residents on Molokai. However, it could be asserted that Pennie Moblo does not account for the separation of civil authorities and religious authorities. As was customary in the time period, Fr. Damien's work was reported to Europeans and Americans in order to raise funds for the mission. How the colony was governed would be outside the scope of the written accounts and not important to raise funds for the charitable works of Father Damien.

Recognition during his lifetime
King David Kalākaua bestowed on Damien the honor of "Knight Commander of the Royal Order of Kalākaua." When Crown Princess Lydia Liliuokalani visited the settlement to present the medal, she was reported as having been too distraught and heartbroken at the sight of the residents to read her speech. The princess shared her experience, acclaiming Damien's efforts. Consequently, Damien became internationally known in the United States and Europe. American Protestants raised large sums of money for the missionary's work. The Church of England sent food, medicine, clothing, and supplies to the settlement. It is believed that Damien never wore the royal medal, although it was placed by his side at his funeral.

Illness and death

Father Damien worked for 16 years in Hawaii, providing comfort to the lepers of Kalaupapa. Not only did he give the people faith, he also built homes for them and treated them with his medical expertise. He prayed at the cemetery of the deceased and comforted the dying at their bedsides.

In December 1884, while he was preparing to bathe, Damien inadvertently put his foot into scalding water, causing his skin to blister. He felt nothing and realized that he had contracted leprosy after working in the colony for 11 years. This was a common way for people to discover that they had been infected with leprosy. Despite his illness, Damien worked even harder.

In 1885, Masanao Goto, a Japanese leprologist, came to Honolulu and treated Damien. He believed that leprosy was caused by a diminution of the blood. His treatment consisted of nourishing foods, moderate exercise, frequent friction to the benumbed parts, special ointments, and medical baths. The treatments relieved some of the symptoms and they were very popular with the Hawaiian patients as a result. Damien had faith in the treatments and said that he only wanted to be treated by Goto, who eventually became a good friend of Father Damien.

Despite the fact that the illness was slowing his body down, Damien engaged in a flurry of activities during his last years. With his remaining time, he tried to advance and complete as many projects as possible. While he was continuing to spread the Catholic Faith and aid the lepers during their treatments, Damien completed several building projects and improved orphanages. Four volunteers arrived at Kalaupapa to help the ailing missionary: a Belgian priest, Louis Lambert Conrardy; a soldier, Joseph Dutton (an American Civil War veteran who left behind a marriage which had been broken by his alcoholism); a male nurse from Chicago, James Sinnett; and Mother (now Saint) Marianne Cope, who had been the head of the Franciscan-run St Joseph's Hospital in Syracuse, New York. Conrardy took up Damien's pastoral duties. Cope organized a working hospital. Dutton attended to the construction and maintenance of the community's buildings. Sinnett nursed Damien during the last phases of his illness.

With an arm in a sling, with a foot in bandages, and with his leg dragging, Damien knew that his death was near. He was bedridden on 23 March 1889, and on 30 March, he made a general confession. Damien died of leprosy at 8:00 a.m. on 15 April 1889, at the age of 49. The next day, after the Mass was said by Father Moellers at St. Philomena's, the whole settlement followed the funeral cortège to the cemetery. Damien was laid to rest under the same pandanus tree where he first slept upon his arrival on Molokai.

In January 1936, at the request of King Leopold III of Belgium and the Belgian government, Damien's body was returned to his native land in Belgium. It was transported aboard the Belgian ship Mercator. Damien was buried in Leuven, the historic university city which is close to the village where he was born. After Damien's beatification in June 1995, the remains of his right hand were returned to Hawaii and re-interred in his original grave on Molokai.

Commentary after his death 

Father Damien had become internationally known before his death, because he was seen as a symbolic Christian figure who spent his life caring for the afflicted natives. His superiors thought that Damien lacked education and finesse but they considered him to be "an earnest peasant hard at work in his own way for God." News of his death on 15 April was quickly carried across the globe by the modern communications of the time, by steamship to Honolulu and California, telegraph to the East Coast of the United States, and cable to England, reaching London on 11 May. Following an outpouring of praise for his work, other voices began to be heard in Hawaii.

Representatives of the Congregational and Presbyterian churches in Hawaii criticized his approach. Reverend Charles McEwen Hyde, a Presbyterian minister in Honolulu, wrote to his fellow pastor Reverend H. B. Gage of San Francisco in August. Hyde referred to Father Damien as "a coarse, dirty man," who contracted leprosy due to "carelessness." Hyde said that Damien was mistakenly being given credit for reforms which had actually been implemented by the Board of Health. Without consulting Hyde, Gage had the letter published in a San Francisco newspaper, generating comment and controversy in the US and Hawaii. The white people of the period consistently overlooked the role which had been played by the Hawaiians themselves, among whom were several who had prominent leadership positions on the island.

Later in 1889, the Scottish author Robert Louis Stevenson and his family arrived in Hawaii for an extended stay. He had tuberculosis, a disease which was also considered incurable, and he was seeking some relief for it. Moved by Damien's story, he became interested in the priest's controversy and went to Molokai for eight days and seven nights. Stevenson wanted to learn more about Damien at the place where he had worked. He spoke with residents of various religious backgrounds in order to learn more about Damien's work. Based on his conversations and observations, he wrote an open letter to Hyde in which he addressed the minister's criticisms and he had it printed at his own expense. Stevenson's letter became the most famous account of Damien, featuring him in the role of a European who was aiding a benighted native people.

In his "6,000-word polemic," Stevenson praised Damien extensively, writing to Hyde:

Stevenson referred to his journal entries in his letter:

Since then, historians and ethnologists have also studied Damien's work and residents' lives on Molokai. For example, Pennie Moblo, in researching the myth and the controversy surrounding the priest, has concluded they did not develop from the religious conflict between Protestants and Catholics, but instead from changes in relationships on Hawaii between and among the royalty, European-American planters, missionaries, and native Hawaiians in the years leading up to the overthrow of the Hawaiian Kingdom and the U.S. takeover.  During this period, Damien had J.K. Kahuila, a Hawaiian Protestant minister in his care, put in irons and deported to Oahu because he believed the man was too rebellious. Kahuila got a lawyer and demanded an investigation of Damien. Moblo concludes that in most 19th- and 20th-century accounts, "the focus on Damien eclipses the active role played by Hawaiians and preserves a colonially biased history."

Mahatma Gandhi said that Father Damien's work had inspired his social campaigns in India, leading to the independence of his people and the securing of aid for needy Indians. Gandhi was quoted in T.N. Jagadisan's 1965 publication Mahatma Gandhi Answers the Challenge of Leprosy:

Canonization

In 1977, Pope Paul VI declared Father Damien to be venerable. On 4 June 1995, Pope John Paul II beatified him and gave him his official spiritual title of Blessed. On 20 December 1999, Jorge Medina Estévez, Prefect of the Congregation for Divine Worship and the Discipline of the Sacraments, confirmed the November 1999 decision of the United States Conference of Catholic Bishops to place Blessed Damien on the liturgical calendar with the rank of an optional memorial. Father Damien was canonized on 11 October 2009 by Pope Benedict XVI. His feast day is celebrated on 10 May. In Hawaii, it is celebrated on the day of his death, 15 April.

Two miracles have been attributed to Father Damien's posthumous intercession. On 13 June 1992, Pope John Paul II approved the cure of a nun in France in 1895 as a miracle attributed to Venerable Damien's intercession. In that case, Sister Simplicia Hue began a novena to Father Damien as she lay dying of a lingering intestinal illness. It is stated that the pain and symptoms of the illness disappeared overnight.

In the second case, Audrey Toguchi, a Hawaiian woman who suffered from a rare form of cancer, had remission after having prayed at the grave of Father Damien on Molokai. There was no medical explanation, as her prognosis was terminal. In 1997, Toguchi was diagnosed with liposarcoma, a cancer that arises in fat cells. She underwent surgery a year later and a tumor was removed, but the cancer metastasized to her lungs. Her physician, Dr. Walter Chang, told her, "Nobody has ever survived this cancer. It's going to take you." Toguchi was still alive in 2016.

In April 2008, the Holy See accepted the two cures as evidence of Father Damien's sanctity. On 2 June 2008, the Congregation for the Causes of Saints at the Vatican voted to recommend raising Father Damien of Molokai to sainthood. The decree that officially notes and verifies the miracle needed for canonization was promulgated by Pope Benedict XVI and Cardinal José Saraiva Martins on 3 July 2008, with the ceremony taking place in Rome and celebrations in Belgium and Hawaii. On 21 February 2009, the Vatican announced that Father Damien would be canonized. The ceremony took place in Rome on Rosary Sunday, 11 October 2009, in the presence of King Albert II of the Belgians and Queen Paola as well as the Belgian Prime Minister, Herman Van Rompuy, and several cabinet ministers, completing the process of canonization. In Washington, D.C., President Barack Obama affirmed his deep admiration for St. Damien, saying that he gave voice to the voiceless and dignity to the sick. Four other individuals were canonized with Father Damien at the same ceremony: Zygmunt Szczęsny Feliński, Sister Jeanne Jugan, Father Francisco Coll Guitart and Rafael Arnáiz Barón.

Damien is honored, together with Marianne Cope, with a feast day on the liturgical calendar of the Episcopal Church (USA) on 15 April.

In arts and media

Films
Director David Miller made a short film of Father Damien's life entitled The Great Heart (1938), released by MGM.
The first full-length film on Father Damien was Molokai (1959), a Spanish production directed by Luis Lucia with Javier Escrivá, Roberto Camardiel, and Gérard Tichy playing the main roles.
Ken Howard had the title role in the television film Father Damien: The Leper Priest (1980); he replaced David Janssen, who died suddenly after several days of shooting.
Stephanie J. Castillo's documentary Simple Courage (1992) explores Damien and his work, drawing parallels between the treatment of persons who have leprosy and the stigma which is associated with persons who have HIV/AIDS. "Simple Courage" was rewarded an EMMY Award in 1993.
The Belgian film producer Tharsi Vanhuysse produced and Paul Cox directed the film Molokai: The Story of Father Damien (1999) with David Wenham as Damien.
Interviews of former residents are featured in the documentary The Soul of Kalaupapa: Voices of Exile (2011). It focuses on the efforts of Belgian-born Father Damien in the 19th century and the efforts of Jonatana Napela, a Hawaiian LDS convert who works with persons with leprosy in Kalaupapa and collaborates on ecumenical efforts.
Splendor Producciones, an Argentinian amateur film-making group, produced a movie about Father Damien's full life which is titled Corazón de Héroe: Padre Damián de Veuster (2021)

Literature
Screenwriter and film director John Farrow wrote the biography Damien the Leper (1937). In 1939, RKO Pictures purchased the book for a feature film titled Father Damien, to be directed by Farrow and star Joseph Calleia. The project was not realized.
The poetic dramatization Father Damien (1938) was written by Edward Snelson, later Joint Secretary to the Government of India (1947), KBE, and dedicated 'To G.,' the actress Greer Garson, to whom he had been married in 1933.
The one-person play Damien by Aldyth Morris was broadcast nationally on PBS in the United States in 1978 and again in 1986 on "American Playhouse." The broadcast received several recognitions, including a Peabody Award. 
The 2016 novel God Made Us Monsters by William Neary explores Father Damien's rise to sainthood.

Monuments and statues

The Father Damien Statue on the steps of the State Capitol Building honors him, and a replica is displayed in the National Statuary Hall Collection in the United States Capitol. Statues in memory of Damien can be found in many Belgian cathedrals, such as the Tournai Cathedral, St Bavo's Cathedral, Ghent, and St Martin's Cathedral, Ypres.
A monument stands in front of St. Benedict's Catholic Church in Honaunau (Hawaii) and is often decorated with Leis.

Legacy and honors

In 2005, Damien was honored with the title of De Grootste Belg, chosen as "The Greatest Belgian" throughout that country's history, in polling conducted by the Flemish public broadcasting service, VRT. He ranked third on Le plus grand Belge ("The Greatest Belgian") in a poll by the French-speaking public channel RTBF.

In 1952, the Picpus Fathers (SS .CC) opened the Damien Museum, (Dutch: Damiaanmuseum ) in Tremelo, Belgium, in the house where Damien was born and grew up. In 2017 the museum was completely renovated.

With canonization highlighting his ministry to persons with leprosy, Father Damien in his work has been cited as an example of how society should minister to HIV/AIDS patients. On the occasion of Damien's canonization, President Barack Obama stated, "In our own time, as millions around the world suffer from disease, especially the pandemic of HIV/AIDS, we should draw on the example of Father Damien’s resolve in answering the urgent call to heal and care for the sick." Several clinics and centers nationwide catering to HIV/AIDS patients bear his name. There is a chapel named for him and dedicated to people with HIV/AIDS, in St. Thomas the Apostle Hollywood, an Episcopal parish.

The Damien The Leper Society is among charities named after him that work to treat and control leprosy. Damien House, Ireland, is a centre for "peace for families and individuals affected by bereavement, stress, violence, and other difficulties with particular attention to Northern Ireland". Saint Damien Advocates is a religious freedom organization that says it wants to carry on Father Damien's work with orphans and others.

Schools named after him include Damien High School in Southern California, Saint Damien Elementary School in Calgary, Canada, and Damien Memorial School in Hawaii. The village of Saint-Damien, Quebec, is also named after him. Churches worldwide are named after him.

St. Damien of Molokai Catholic Church in Edmond, Oklahoma, dedicated in 2010, is believed to have been the first Roman Catholic church in the continental United States to be named for Saint Damien after his canonization. A Traditional Latin Mass church, it is operated by the Priestly Fraternity of St. Peter (FSSP) and was authorized in 2010 by Eusebius J. Beltran, Archbishop of Oklahoma City. Pontiac, Michigan (in the Catholic archdiocese of Detroit) has a St. Damien parish.

Marianne of Molokaʻi was canonized in 2012.

See also
Kalaupapa National Historical Park
American Catholic Servants of God, Venerables, Beatified, and Saints
List of American saints and beatified people
Father Damien, patron saint archive

References

Sources

Further reading
Farrow, John. Damien the Leper. (first edition 1937; latest edition 1998)

External links

 Saint Damien of Molokai
 Kalaupapa National Historic Park – about the human and natural community of Father Damien's work
 

Roman Catholic missionaries in Hawaii
People from Molokai
1840 births
1889 deaths
Deaths from leprosy
Anglican saints
Beatifications by Pope John Paul II
Belgian humanitarians
Flemish priests
Hawaii Catholic priests
Belgian Roman Catholic missionaries
Belgian Roman Catholic saints
People from Kalawao County, Hawaii
People from Tremelo
Picpus Fathers
Recipients of the Royal Order of Kalākaua
Roman Catholic Diocese of Honolulu
19th-century Christian saints
19th-century Belgian Roman Catholic priests
Canonizations by Pope Benedict XVI
Superintendents of Kalaupapa
Belgian emigrants to the Hawaiian Kingdom